Joseph C. Johnston (October 26, 1938 – September 19, 2015) was an American politician in the state of Iowa.

Joe Johnston was born in Waterloo, Iowa. He was a lawyer. He served in the Iowa House of Representatives from 1969 to 1973 as a Democrat. He was the Democratic nominee for U.S. Congress from Iowa's Third District, running unsuccessfully against Republican incumbent Cooper Evans. Following his death, the Iowa House of Representatives passed a resolution "in appreciation of his service."

References

1938 births
Politicians from Waterloo, Iowa
Iowa lawyers
Democratic Party members of the Iowa House of Representatives
2015 deaths